Bjesovi is the self-titled and second album of the Serbian rock band Bjesovi released in 1994.

Track listing 
All tracks written by  Goran Marić and Zoran Marinković, except where noted.
 "Vraćam se dole" – 2:45
 "Ime – 4:50
 "Gavran" – 6:57
 "Vreme je" – 4:57
 "U osvit zadnjeg dana" – 3:38
 "Ona te... voli" – 7:35
 "Ne budi me (ubij me)" – 5:07
 "Avioni pevaju" – 7:17

Personnel 
 Dejan Petrović – bass
 Miroslav Marjanović – drums
 Predrag Dabić – guitar
 Zoran Filipović – guitar
 Goran Marić – vocals
 Zoran Marinković – vocals
 Vidan Papić – harmonica on track 8
 Vladimir Lešić – percussion on track 8

External links 

 EX YU ROCK enciklopedija 1960-2006, Janjatović Petar; 
 Bjesovi at Discogs

Bjesovi albums
1994 albums
Heavy metal albums by Serbian artists